This is a list of notable government-owned companies of Bangladesh.

A
 Adamjee Jute Mills
 Ashuganj Fertilizer and Chemical Company Limited
 Ashuganj Power Station Company Limited
 Bakhrabad Gas Distribution Company Limited
 Bangladesh Agricultural Development Corporation
 Bangladesh Blade Factory Limited
 Bangladesh Chemical Industries Corporation
 Bangladesh Communication Satellite Company Limited
 Bangladesh Diesel Plant Limited
 Bangladesh Film Development Corporation
 Bangladesh Fisheries Development Corporation
 Bangladesh Forest Industries Development Corporation
 Bangladesh Gas Fields Company Limited
 Bangladesh House Building Finance Corporation
 Bangladesh Infrastructure Finance Fund Limited
 Bangladesh Inland Water Transport Corporation
 Bangladesh Insulator and Sanitaryware Factory Limited
 Bangladesh Jute Mills Corporation
 Bangladesh Machine Tools Factory
 Bangladesh Municipal Development Fund
 Bangladesh Ordnance Factories
 Bangladesh Overseas Employment and Services Limited
 Bangladesh Parjatan Corporation
 Bangladesh Petroleum Exploration and Production Company Limited
 Bangladesh Shipping Corporation
 Bangladesh Small and Cottage Industries Corporation
 Bangladesh Steel and Engineering Corporation
 Bangladesh Submarine Cable Company Limited
 Bangladesh Sugar and Food Industries Corporation
 Bangladesh Telecommunications Company Limited
 Bangladesh Textile Mills Corporation
  Bangladesh Power Development Board

C
 Carew & Co (Bangladesh) Ltd
 Chittagong Dry Dock Limited
 Chittagong Urea Fertilizer Limited
 Coal Power Generation Company Bangladesh Limited

D
 Dhaka Electric Supply Company Limited
 Dhaka Power Distribution Company
 Dockyard and Engineering Works Limited

E

 Eastern Cables Limited
 Eastern Refinery Limited
 Eastern Tubes Limited
Eastern Lubricants Blenders Limited
 Electricity Generation Company of Bangladesh
 Essential Drugs Company

G

 Gas Transmission Company Limited
 Gazi Wires Limited

I

 Infrastructure Development Company Limited
 Infrastructure Investment Facilitation Company
 Investment Corporation of Bangladesh

J

 Jamuna Fertilizer Company Limited
 Jiban Bima Corporation

K

 Karnaphuli Fertilizer Company Limited
 Karnaphuli Gas Distribution Company Limited
 Karnaphuli Paper Mills

M
  Milk Vita
  Miracle Industries Limited
  MJLBL

N
 National Tubes Limited
 North West Zone Power Distribution Company Limited
 Northern Electricity Supply Company PLC
 Northwest Power Generation Company
 Nuclear Power Plant Company Bangladesh Limited

P

 Palli Karma Sahayak Foundation
 Petrobangla
 Power Grid Company of Bangladesh Limited
 Pragoti
 Padma Oil Company Limited

R

 Rupantarita Prakritik Gas Company Limited
 Rural Electrification Board
 Rural Power Company Limited

S
Sundarban Gas Distribution Company Limited
 Sadharan Bima Corporation
 Shahjalal Fertiliser Factory
 Shyampur Sugar Mills
 Sylhet Gas Fields Limited

T

 Telephone Shilpa Sangstha
 Teletalk Bangladesh Limited
 Trading Corporation of Bangladesh
 Triple Super Phosphate Complex Limited
 Titas Gas Transmission and Distribution Company Limited

U

 Usmania Glass Sheet Factory Limited

W

 West Zone Power Distribution Company Limited

References

Government-owned
Bangladesh